The Colorado Buffaloes are the athletic teams that represent the University of Colorado. The university sponsors 17 varsity sports teams. Both the men's and women's teams are called the Buffaloes (Buffs for short) or, rarely, the Golden Buffaloes. "Lady Buffs" referred to the women's teams beginning in the 1970s, but was officially dropped in 1993. The nickname was selected by the campus newspaper in a contest with a $5 prize in 1934 won by Andrew Dickson of Boulder.

The university participates as a member of the Pac-12 Conference at the National Collegiate Athletic Association (NCAA) Division I Football Bowl Subdivision (FBS) level. Rick George was announced as the sixth athletic director in program history on July 17, 2013, following the resignation of Mike Bohn, and after an interim appointment by former Women's Basketball Head Coach former deputy Athletic Director Ceal Barry. Colorado has won 29 national championships in its history, with 20 in skiing, the most recent coming in 2015. It was ranked #14 of "America's Best Sports College" in a 2002 analysis performed by Sports Illustrated.

Colorado does not have intercollegiate men's programs in baseball, tennis, soccer, lacrosse, or volleyball. There is no women's softball program, one of three Pac-12 members without.

History
Competitive football began on the Boulder campus in 1890. Early games, which bore more resemblance to rugby than modern football, were played against the School of Mines and Utah. The football stadium, originally "Colorado Stadium," was opened in 1924 and was officially renamed Folsom Field in November 1944 to honor Coach Fred Folsom, one of the most respected college football coaches of his day.

In 1934, the university's intercollegiate teams were officially nicknamed the "Buffaloes." Previous nicknames used by the press included the "Silver Helmets" and "Frontiersmen." The final game of 1934, against the University of Denver, saw also the inaugural running of a bison in a Colorado football game. A bison calf was rented from a local ranch and ran along the sidelines.

The year 1947 marked key point in race relations on campus. The Buffaloes joined the Big Eight Conference. However, Missouri and Oklahoma had rules which would not have allowed them to challenge teams with "colored" players. A student outcry, led by campus paper Silver and Gold, led to a movement against these Jim Crow restrictions which expanded to all the campuses of the Big 7 and eventually lead to their repeal.

On June 10, 2010, the Buffaloes announced that they would join the Pacific-10 Conference, soon renamed the Pac-12 Conference, in all sports beginning on July 1, 2011.

Varsity sports

The University of Colorado was a member of the Colorado Football Association in 1893, and became a charter member of the Colorado Faculty Athletic Conference in 1909, which changed its name a year later to Rocky Mountain Faculty Athletic Conference. Colorado left the RMFAC to become a charter member of the Mountain States Conference (a.k.a. Skyline Conference) in 1938. CU joined the Missouri Valley Intercollegiate Athletic Association in 1947, then commonly known as the Big Six, changing the common name to the Big Seven. In 1958, the conference added OSU to become the Big Eight Conference. It remained the Big 8 until 1996, when it combined with four member schools of the defunct Southwest Conference (Texas, Texas A&M, Texas Tech, and Baylor) to create the Big 12 Conference.

On July 1, 2011, the school joined the Pac-12 Conference, along with Utah.  A total of 12 of CU's 17 varsity sports compete in the Pac-12, except the ski teams, indoor track & field teams and the lacrosse team. The ski teams participate in the Rocky Mountain Intercollegiate Ski Association (RMISA), of which it has been a member since 1947, along with fellow Pac-12 newcomer Utah. The indoor track & field teams participate in the Mountain Pacific Sports Federation (MPSF) as the Pac-12 doesn't sponsor indoor track.  Women's lacrosse was added in the spring of 2014; that team competed in the MPSF until the Pac-12 Conference added women's lacrosse as a sport for the 2018 season.

Colorado is the only Pac-12 school and one of only four Power 5 schools that do not sponsor baseball, along with Iowa State, Syracuse, and Wisconsin.  CU does not have a women's softball program, one of three Pac-12 members (USC, Washington State) opting not to participate.

Football

The Colorado football program is 16th on the all-time NCAA Division I win list and 22nd in all-time winning percentage (.614). Since Folsom Field was built in 1924, the Buffaloes have been  at home. The Nebraska game in 2006 was CU's 1100th football game.  Bill McCartney is the most famous head coach, leading Colorado to its only national championship in 1990. Current head coach Deion Sanders was approved by the university's board of regents in December 2022.

Beginning competitive play in 1890, Colorado has enjoyed much success through its history. The team has won numerous bowl games (27 appearances in bowl games (12-15), 23rd (tied) all-time prior to 2004 season), 8 Colorado Football Association Championships (1894–97, 1901–08), 1 Colorado Faculty Athletic Conference (1909), 7 RFMAC Championships (1911, 1913, 1923, 1924, 1934, 1935, 1937), 4 Mountain States Conference Championships (1939, 1942–44), 5 Big Eight (Six) conference championships (1961, 1976, 1989, 1990, 1991), 1 Big 12 conference championship (2001), 4 Big 12 North Championships (2001, 2002, 2004, 2005), and an Associated Press national championship in 1990. The team holds rivalries with Nebraska, Colorado State, and Utah.

Colorado football also has one Heisman Trophy winner:
Rashaan Salaam (1994)

There have also been 9 unanimous All-Americans:
 Eric Bieniemy (1990)
 Joe Garten (1990)
 Alfred Williams (1990)
 Jay Leeuwenburg (1991)
 Rashaan Salaam (1994)
 Daniel Graham (2001)
 Mason Crosby (2005)
 Jordan Dizon (2007)
 Nate Solder (2010)

There are seven players and one coach in the College Football Hall of Fame: 
 Byron "Whizzer" White (inducted 1952)
 Joe Romig (1984)
 Dick Anderson (1993)
 Bobby Anderson (2006)
 Alfred Williams (2010)
 John Wooten (2012)
 Bill McCartney (2013)
 Herb Orvis (2016)

Men's basketball

They play at the CU Events Center on campus and are 465-179 (.722) at home, through the 2020-21 season, including 139-24 (.853) in 11 years under coach Tad Boyle.

¹ Invitations

Women's basketball

Women's Basketball started at Colorado in 1975. The team has had seven coaches and the current coach is JR Payne.

Skiing
The CU ski team competes as a member of the Rocky Mountain Intercollegiate Ski Association, as CU is one of two members of the Pac-12 along with Utah that competes in skiing. Colorado is one of the dominant programs in the NCAA in skiing, winning 20 total national championships, including 19 NCAA Championships, most recently in 2015. The Buffs have won three NCAA Championships since 2011, and have finished in the top four at NCAAs for 15 straight years with four championships (2006, 2011, 2013, 2015) in that span.  The 15 straight top four finishes is the longest streak in the country. The Buffaloes have won 28 RMISA championships, most recently in 2017. The Buffaloes have had 53 individuals connected to the school participate in the Olympics 85 times. Colorado has had 100 individual National Champions, including Magnus Boee sweeping the men's Nordic titles and Cassidy Gray winning the women's GS championship in 2021.

Cross country
Boulder's high elevation of  adds aerobic stress to distance runners and is known to produce a competitive edge when altitude-trained athletes compete at sea level. The 1998 cross country team was the subject of a book, Running with the Buffaloes, which documents the team's training regimen under long-time coach Mark Wetmore. Colorado has won five NCAA Men's Cross Country Championships (2001, 2004, 2006, 2013, and 2014) and three NCAA Women's Cross Country Championships (2000, 2004, 2018). The men's team also has won four individual titles (Mark Scrutton, Adam Goucher, Jorge Torres, and Dathan Ritzenhein), while the women's side has won two (Kara Goucher, Dani Jones).

The men won the first twelve Big 12 Conference titles in the conference's history and the women won 11 of the first 12 (all but 1998-99), with the two teams combining for 23 of the 32 championships awarded before the Buffs left the Big 12 in 2011 to join the Pac-12. Since joining the Pac-12 Conference, the Colorado men won their first six conference titles (2011, 2012, 2013, 2014, 2015, 2016) and the Colorado women have claimed four conference titles, including three consecutive following a shot lapse (2011, 2015, 2016, 2017).

Baseball
The Colorado Buffaloes baseball team was discontinued after the 1980 season. Baseball, wrestling, men's and women's gymnastics, men's and women's swimming, and women's diving comprised the seven programs that were discontinued on June 11, 1980, due to  Colorado is the only Pac-12 school and one of only four Power 5 schools that do not sponsor baseball, the other three being Iowa State, Syracuse and Wisconsin.

Men's golf
The men's golf team won three Big Eight Conference championships: 1954, 1955 (co-champions), 1968. Hale Irwin won the 1967 NCAA Championship.

Club sports
Colorado has a very active and developed club sports system with over 30 sports. 

Baseball
Crew
Cycling
Dance
Diving
Equestrian
Fencing
Field hockey
Fly fishing
 Freestyle skiing
Men's ice hockey
Women's ice hockey
Kayaking
Men's lacrosse
Women's lacrosse
Racquetball
Roller hockey
Men's rugby
Women's rugby
Running
Snowboarding
Men's soccer
Women's soccer
Women's softball
Swimming
Taekwondo
Co-ed tennis
CU Triathlon Team
 Men's ultimate
Women's ultimate
Men's volleyball
Women's volleyball
Water polo
Men's wrestling

Men's rugby 
Colorado's rugby program was founded in 1967. The Buffaloes play in the Western Division of Division I-A, where they play against local rivals such as Colorado State and less localized teams like the New Mexico and Utah State. The Buffaloes are led by head coach  Murray Wallace, assisted by John Barkmeier Chris Dyas, Justin Holshuh, Conor Sears, and Steve Brown. Kevin Whitcher coaches the Buffaloes sevens team.
The Buffaloes have consistently been ranked among the top college rugby teams in the country.

Colorado's best run was 1984–1985, when it reached the 1984 national finals before losing 12-4 to powerhouse Cal, and finished third in the 1985 national playoffs losing again to eventual champion Cal, this time in the semifinals. More recently, in 2008 the Buffaloes went 15-3 and reached the semifinals of the national championships. Colorado won the 2011 Pac-12 rugby sevens tournament, defeating Utah 14–12 in the final, to qualify for the 2011 USA Rugby collegiate rugby sevens national championship. Colorado finished the 2011–12 season ranked 14th in the nation. In the 2012–13 season, Colorado defeated Wisconsin 54-24 to advance to the national D1-A quarterfinals, before losing to St. Mary's. The Buffs also won the plate final in the 2015–2016 season at the Las Vegas Invitational 7s tournament in the college bracket. Most recently the Buffs lost in the plate final to Clemson in the inaugural international Red Bull University Sevens tournament.

The Buffs are currently ranked 20th in the nation  with a competitive season ahead, and plans to travel further West in the spring.

Championships

NCAA team championships

Colorado has won 27 national championships. 
Men's (16)
Cross Country (5): 2001, 2004, 2006, 2013, 2014
Skiing (11): 1959, 1960, 1972, 1973, 1974, 1975, 1976, 1977, 1978, 1979, 1982
Women's (3)
Cross Country (3): 2000, 2004, 2018
Co-ed (8)
Skiing (8): 1991, 1995, 1998, 1999, 2006, 2011, 2013, 2015
see also:
Pac-12 Conference NCAA championships
List of NCAA schools with the most NCAA Division I championships

Other national team championships
Men's (1)
Football (1): 1990
Women's (1)
Skiing (1): 1982 (AIAW)
Note: Skiing was a men's NCAA sport from 1954–82 and became co-ed in 1983.  The AIAW sponsored women's skiing and a national championship from 1977-82 before being absorbed by the NCAA at which time skiing became co-ed.

Traditions
The University has had several fight songs that have lost and gained popularity over the years. The oldest, "Glory Colorado", is sung to the tune of "Battle Hymn of the Republic" and has been around nearly as long as the school. Glory Colorado is considered to represent all campuses of the University. "Go Colorado" was originally sung exclusively by the Glee Club at football games, though it is now played and known almost exclusively by members of the Golden Buffalo Marching Band. The most popular of the three fight songs and the most widely recognized is "Fight CU." Originally sung by the football team, the song has gained enough popularity that few people outside the band know that it is not the only fight song of the university. The original version included the line "fight, fight for every yard" but the line was changed to "fight, fight for victory" to allow the song to be used for all sports, not just football.

Mascots
The two mascots present at all football games are Ralphie, a live buffalo, and Chip, a costumed mascot who was selected to the 2003 Capital One All-America Mascot Team and won the 2009, 2010 and 2020 UCA Mascot National Championships. Ralphie is actually Ralphie VI and leads the football team onto the field at the beginning of the first and second halves. A buffalo leading the team onto the field dates as far back as 1934 and the Ralphie tradition began in 1966.  In 1934 after the selection of Buffaloes as a nickname when a group of students paid $25 to rent a buffalo calf and cowboy as his keeper for the last game of the season. The calf was the son of Killer, a famed bison at Trails End Ranch in Fort Collins, Colorado. It took the cowboy and four students to keep the calf under control on the sidelines during the game, a 7–0 win at the University of Denver on Thanksgiving Day.

Colors
The official school colors are silver and gold, adopted in 1888 as a symbol of the mineral wealth of the state. In 1959, the athletic teams started using black and yellow, because silver and gold ended up looking like dirty white and dirty yellow. The colors have stuck and many are unaware that the official school colors are silver and gold.

On May 28, 1981, black was curiously replaced by "Sky Blue" by a mandate of the CU Board of Regents, to represent the color of the Colorado sky. However, this color was different from the blue uniforms of the U.S. Air Force Academy. After three years, the blue was changed in 1984 to a darker shade, though still unpopular. In black and white photographs the players' numbers are nearly invisible. During a difficult 1-10 season in 1984, football head coach Bill McCartney employed black "throwback" jerseys for an emotional lift for the games against Oklahoma and Nebraska, without success.

In April 1985, the CU athletic teams were given the option of blue or black. The football team chose to wear black, and at Folsom Field the background for the signature "Colorado" arc (at the base of the seats behind the south end zone), blue for four years, was repainted black as well. On the football uniforms, the blue was reduced to a stripe on the sleeve for three seasons (1985–87) before being dropped completely in 1988. In 2007, CU debuted new football jerseys that reintegrated silver as a uniform color.

Facilities

University of Colorado Athletic Hall of Fame

Criteria for automatic selection: Three-time all-conference selection, two-time All-American, trophy winner or previously retired jersey. Beginning in 2015, the school went from a two-year to one year induction cycle to catch up on its history. Inductees are nominated by their peers in the Alumni C Club or by members of the selection committee.

Class of 1998
Byron White (football, basketball, baseball, track, 1935–38)

Class of 1999
Gil Cruter (track, 1934–37)
Burdette "Burdie" Haldorson (basketball, 1952–55)
William "Kayo" Lam (football, 1933–35)
Joe Romig (football, 1959–61)
Lisa Van Goor (basketball, 1981–85)

Class of 2000
David Bolen (track, 1946–48)
Jimmie Heuga (skiing, 1961–63)
Dean Lahr (wrestling, 1962–64)
Pat Patten (wrestling, cross country, track, 1940–47)

Class of 2002
Dick Anderson (football, 1965–67)
Harry Carlson (baseball coach, athletic director, 1927–65)
Darian Hagan (football, 1988–91)
Carroll Hardy (baseball, football, track, 1951–54)
Hale Irwin (golf, football, 1964–67)
Russell "Sox" Walseth (men's and women's basketball coach, 1956–76 and 1980–83)

Class of 2004
Don Branby (football, basketball, baseball, 1949–52)
Eddie Crowder (football coach, athletic director 1963–84)
Cliff Meely (basketball, 1968–71)
Frank Potts (track coach, 1927–68)
Shelley Sheetz (basketball, 1991–95)
Bill Toomey (track, 1959–61)
John Wooten (football, 1956–58)

Class of 2006
1959 NCAA Champion Ski Team
Bobby Anderson (football)
Fred Casotti (sports information director, historian)
Adam Goucher (cross country, track, 1994–97)
Bill Marolt (skiing champion, skiing coach, athletic director)
Bill McCartney (football coach, 1982–94)

Class of 2008
Don Campbell (track, 1946–50)
Frank Clarke (football, 1954–56)
Kara Grgas-Wheeler (cross country, track, 1996-2002)
Billy Lewis (basketball, track, 1957–60)
Dave Logan (football, basketball, 1972–76)
John Stearns (baseball, football, 1970–73)
Claude Walton (track, 1933–36)
Dal Ward (football, administration, 1948–74)
Alfred Williams (football, 1987–90)

Class of 2010
Ceal Barry (basketball, 1983–2005)
Eric Bieniemy (football, 1987–90)
Tera Bjorklund (basketball, 2000–04)
Cliff Branch (football, 1970–72)
Kelly Campbell (volleyball, 1996–99)
Ken Charlton (basketball, 1960–63)
Dale Douglass (golf, 1958–59)
Bob Stransky (football, 1955–57)
Bridget Turner (basketball, 1985–89)
Buddy Werner (skiing, 1959, 1961–63)

Class of 2012
Frank Bernardi (football, baseball, 1952–55)
Alan Culpepper (cross country, track, 1992–96)
Mary Decker Slaney (cross country, track, 1977–79)
Boyd Dowler (football, 1956–58)
Joe Garten (football, 1987–90)
Jack Harvey (basketball, 1937–40)
Steve Jones (golf, 1977–81)
Leason "Pete" McCloud (basketball, 1939–42)
Vidar Nilsgard (skiing, 1971–74)
Matt Russell (football, 1993–96)
Rashaan Salaam (football, 1992–94)
Larry Zimmer (announcer, 1971–present)

Class of 2014
Bob Beattie (skiing coach, 1957–65)
Forrest B. "Frosty" Cox (basketball coach, 1935–50)
Jim Davis (basketball, 1961–64)
Deon Figures (football, 1988–92)
Bob Jeangerard (basketball, 1952–55)
Linn Long (wrestling, coach, 1952–68)
Don Meyers (track, coach 1959-75)
Herb Orvis (football, 1969–71)
Yvonne Scott (track, 1992–96)

Class of 2015
Chauncey Billups (basketball, 1995–97)
Jon Burianek (administration, 1968–2006)
Bill Fanning (baseball, 1946–49)
Stephan Hienzsch (skiing, 1975–78)
Frank Prentup (baseball coach, football coach, 1941–69)
Mike Pritchard (football, 1987–90)
Erin Scholz (basketball, 1993–97)
Mark Scrutton (cross country, track, 1979–83)
Nicole Vranesh (volleyball, 1990–93)
Scott Wedman (basketball, 1971–74)
Tom Woodard (golf, 1973–77)

Class of 2016
Dale "Pete" Atkins
Bill Brundige
Ted Castaneda
Sara Gorton (Slattery)
Jerry Hillebrant
Chris Hudson
Bob Justice
Bob Kalinowski
Jim Miller
Fran Munnelly
Shaun Vandiver
Michael Westbrook

Class of 2017
Stan Brock
Chad Brown
Frank Brown
Karrie Downey
Les Fowler
Steve Hatchell
Mark Haynes
Jay Humphries
Jamillah Lang
Jorge Torres

Notable alumni
Byron White was a Supreme Court Justice after his football career.
Hale Irwin, who was a two-time All-Big Eight defensive back and an NCAA individual golf champion at Colorado, went on to spectacular success in professional golf. He won three U.S. Opens and 17 other PGA Tour events, and is the all-time leader in both wins and career prize money on the 50-and-over tour now known as PGA Tour Champions.
Adam Goucher was a professional runner who competed for the United States in the 2000 Summer Olympics.
Chauncey Billups played for the Boston Celtics, Denver Nuggets, Detroit Pistons, Los Angeles Clippers, Minnesota Timberwolves, New York Knicks and Toronto Raptors in a 17-year NBA career (1997–2014). He was named the NBA Finals MVP in 2004.
Jeremy Bloom played football and skied internationally finishing 6th in the 2006 Winter Olympics in the moguls and briefly played in the NFL. He also sued the NCAA and lost, having to give up football for Colorado in 2004 because he received endorsement money for skiing.
Bill Toomey won the gold medal in the decathlon at the 1968 Summer Olympics
Jimmie Heuga, 1964 Olympic bronze medalist, and Spider Sabich were both CU alpine ski racers from northern California.(Billy Kidd, 1964 Olympic silver medalist, is a CU alumnus, but did not race for the Buffs.He skied for the University of Vermont before joining the U.S. Ski Team, and later finished his bachelor's degree in Boulder.)
Emma Coburn is a former World Champion and American record holder in the 3000 meters steeplechase.  She won the bronze medal at the 2016 Summer Olympics, becoming the inaugural American to win any medal in the event, with an American record of 9:07.63.  In London at the 2017 World Championships, she became the inaugural American woman to win the Gold Medal, bettering her American record to 9:02.59. 
Jennifer Simpson represented the United States at the 2008 Beijing Olympics, 2012 London Olympics and 2016 Rio Olympics. She is a former American record holder for the 3000 meters steeplechase. In the 1500 meters, she won a gold medal at the 2011 World Championships, a silver medal at the 2013 and 2017 World Championships, and a bronze medal at the 2016 Summer Olympics in Rio, becoming the inaugural US woman to win a medal in the Olympics in any distance event along with Coburn.
Stuart Krohn (born 1962), professional rugby union player

References

External links

 

 
College sports in Colorado
Sports in Boulder, Colorado